Agrotis andina is a moth of the family Noctuidae. It is found in the Maule Region and Biobío Region of Chile as well as the Tucumán Province of Argentina.

The wingspan is 33–36 mm. Adults are on wing from September to April.

External links
 Noctuinae of Chile

Agrotis
Moths of South America
Moths described in 1945